The Rascals (initially known as The Young Rascals) were an American rock band, formed in Garfield, New Jersey, United States, in 1965.

Between 1966 and 1968 the New Jersey act embraced soul music, reaching the top 20 of the Billboard Hot 100 with nine singles, including the #1s "Good Lovin'" (1966), "Groovin'" (1967), and "People Got to Be Free" (1968), as well as big radio hits such as the much-covered "How Can I Be Sure?" (#4 1967) and "A Beautiful Morning" (#3 1968), plus another critical favorite "A Girl Like You" (#10 1967), becoming one of the best known examples of the blue-eyed soul genre, along with the Righteous Brothers. The band was inducted into the Rock and Roll Hall of Fame in 1997.

The Rascals were inducted into the Hit Parade Hall of Fame in 2010 and also reunited in 2012 for a series of shows in New York and New Jersey. The reunion continued in 2013 with shows on Broadway.

History

Origins 
Felix Cavaliere was already trained in classical piano by his mother when he founded a doo-wop group, the Escorts (not the R&B group of the same name), while enrolled at Syracuse University.  In 1964, Cavaliere took a job with Joey Dee's backing band, the Starliters, of the "Peppermint Twist" fame, where he met Starliter David Brigati. When the group played the Choo Choo Club in Garfield, New Jersey, Cavaliere met Brigati's younger brother, Eddie, who wanted to follow in his brother's footsteps. Cavaliere, in an interview with journalist Don Paulson, spoke about his first encounter with the younger Brigati:

Canadian guitarist Gene Cornish left his group, The Unbeatables, for which he acted as their frontman, to join the Starliters, in early 1965. After meeting Cornish, Cavaliere's interest in forming a band of his own led him to convince both Cornish and (Eddie) Brigati to depart from Dee's backing band to start a new one with an old acquaintance of his, jazz drummer Dino Danelli. The group came up with the name "Rascals" while at the Choo Choo Club.  Prior to the Rascals name they were using another group name "Them".  Because there was another group using the name "Them" in the UK they dropped that name and came up with The Rascals name through the help of TV comedy star Soupy Sales who they met through manager Billy (Amato)  Smith. The Rascals were Sales's back up band touring local colleges in the early months of 1965.

Initially, the Rascals began rehearsing at Cavaliere's house in Pelham Manor, New York and then, the Choo Choo Club, mostly because it was close to Brigati's home and they needed a showcase. Later in May 1965, under the direction of their management Billy (Amato) Smith, they were hired to do a summer engagement at the debut club of The Barge on Dune Road in Westhampton New York, a floating Long Island club, where they settled. There they developed their mixed R&B-soul sound based on Cavaliere's organ and soulful vocals, mostly filled with traditional R&B covers.

The quartet did not have any official bass player, because of Brigati's inability to play musical instruments, other than percussion (even when the band bought him a Fender Mustang Bass in 1967) and the Rascals' wish of staying in the formula of four members. Cavaliere's organ pedals (and later, session bassists, like Chuck Rainey, in studio recordings) filled the bass parts.

Manager Billy (Amato) Smith who discovered them at the beginning of their music career as the Rascals and in August 1965 directed the Rascals while showcasing the group at the Barge on Dune Road in Westhampton New York to Sid Bernstein, an impresario known at the time for helping to promote the British Invasion, bringing famous UK bands like the Beatles and the Rolling Stones to America.

To promote the band, in August 1965, it was Bernstein and Smith  that came up with a publicity stunt famously posted the phrase "The Rascals are coming!" at the Shea Stadium's scoreboard, at the same time that the Fab Four were doing the opening of their 1965 North American tour. Beatles manager Brian Epstein ordered the post to be removed before his band arrived on the stage.

This event helped the group to get a $15,000 contract with Atlantic Records, a label which only had black artists, becoming the first white-only act to be signed at Atlantic. Sid Bernstein would manage them for the next five years and Billy (Amato) Smith as their publicist and promotion advisor. The contract also stipulated that the band could self-produce their records. But problems arose when they discovered that another group, Borrah Minnevitch's and Johnny Puleo's 'Harmonica Rascals', objected to their release of records under the name 'The Rascals'. To avoid conflict, Bernstein decided to rename the group 'The Young Rascals', possibly because all the members were under 25.

Commercial success and songwriting development 
The line-up of Brigati on vocals, Cavaliere on organ, Cornish on guitar and Danelli on drums would stay true in the Young Rascals' debut single, the Pam Sawyer/Lori Burton "I Ain't Gonna Eat Out My Heart Anymore", which was performed in their first television performance on the program Hullabaloo on February 24, 1966. But the track reached only #23 in Canada and did not reach the Top 40 of the US charts. After "Eat Out My Heart Anymore"'s modest success, Cavaliere would assume the lead vocals on their subsequent records, starting with its follow-up "Good Lovin'", originally recorded by Lemme B. Good and The Olympics in 1965, with the same arrangement and different lyrics from the original. They performed "Good Lovin'" on The Ed Sullivan Show. The Young Rascals version became their first Canada/USA #1. Shortly after, their eponymous debut album was released, mostly composed of garage rock renditions of folk rock ("Just a Little" and "Like a Rolling Stone"), and soul tunes ("Mustang Sally" and "In the Midnight Hour"), with only one original, the Cavaliere/Cornish penned "Do You Feel It". The Young Rascals reached #15 on the Billboard Top LPs chart and #10 in Cashbox. The album was certified Gold by the RIAA.

From there, the songwriting partnership between Felix Cavaliere and Eddie Brigati began to flourish. Cavaliere wrote the music and themes, and Brigati, the verses with the former's help. Their second album, Collections, had four Cavaliere/Brigati songs and two Cornish originals in its eleven tracks. Follow-ups to their number one record, "You Better Run" – later covered by Pat Benatar in 1980 – and "Come On Up", did not do as well as their predecessor (peaking at #20 and #43, respectively).

In the meantime, Cavaliere started to date high school student  Adrienne Bechurri. His relationship inspired him to write several songs in 1967, including Top 20 "I've Been Lonely Too Long" and Top 10's "How Can I Be Sure", and "Groovin'", their second #1. "Groovin'", having its laid-back sound and a Afro-Cuban groove, found some resistance with Atlantic's head Jerry Wexler; "I've Been Lonely Too Long" and the jazz-influenced "A Girl Like You" talked about the advantages of a relationship against loneliness, but the  introspective "How Can I Be Sure", with Brigati's lead vocals, expressed the doubts about love, like Cavaliere's conflicting feelings about Bechurri. All these songs were included at the Groovin' album, which had the majority of the tracks penned by Cavaliere/Brigati. Bruce Eder, writing for AllMusic, rates Groovin' as the Rascals' best, noting the record's soulful core and innovative use of jazz and Latin instrumental arrangements.

Groovin''' marked the first time that the Young Rascals used outside musicians, bringing some important collaborators like Chuck Rainey, Hubert Laws and David Brigati to augment their sound. Particularly, D.Brigati would also help his brother's band in arranging vocal harmonies and singing background on many Rascals records.

The band, especially Cavaliere, wanted to depart from their "singles act" label to be more like an "albums act", something that would become common to more artists at the late 1960s. The album Once Upon a Dream, released at 1968, is an example of this change, because it was the first Rascals album designed from conception as an album, rather than as a vehicle to package their singles (eight of Groovin''s eleven songs had been released as single A or B sides, most in advance of the album). Once Upon a Dream also incorporated Indian music in its sound, adding Eastern instruments like sitar, tamboura and tabla. David Brigati also makes a special appearance on the album, singing lead on the title track. The psychedelic "It's Wonderful" was released before the album, but its different style, in comparison with their earlier singles, hindered its sales and the single only reached the #20. The album's song "My Hawaii" became a top of the charts hit in Hawaii.

The band would bill themselves as the Young Rascals for the last time with the single release of "It's Wonderful"; from that point on they were known as simply 'The Rascals'.

Their first official single release as "the Rascals" was the optimistic 1968's "A Beautiful Morning", which reached #3. Internationally, the band was exceptionally popular in Canada where "A Girl Like You", "How Can I Be Sure?" and "A Beautiful Morning" all reached #1. But they struggled in the UK, where they only twice reached the top 75, with "Groovin'" (#8) and "A Girl Like You" (#35).Time Peace: The Rascals' Greatest Hits, released in mid-1968, topped the U.S. album chart and became the group's best-selling album.

The same year, "People Got to Be Free", a horn-punctuated plea for racial tolerance (the band was known for refusing to tour on segregated bills) just months after the assassination of Martin Luther King Jr. and of Robert F. Kennedy, became their third and final U.S. #1 single, and their sixth and final Canadian #1. It was also their final U.S. Top Ten hit, although they remained a Canadian top 10 act for the next few years.

In 1969, the Rascals released the double album Freedom Suite. An album with one LP dedicated to "conventional" songs and another to instrumentals, it should have been the band's definitive change to produce more ambitious albums, according to Richie Unterberger. But Freedom Suite would be their last Top 40 album, peaking at #17.

Brigati's songwriting contributions diminished on this album, in favor of Cavaliere's solo compositions, as well his vocals, singing lead only on two songs on Freedom Suite. His participation would decline even more in later albums.

 Commercial waning and demise 
The follow-ups "A Ray of Hope", "Heaven", "See", and "Carry Me Back" were all modest U.S. hits for the band during late 1968 and 1969; all entered the top 40, but none higher than #24. In Canada, however, the Rascals were still major stars; all these songs went top ten, completing a run of 11 straight Canadian top ten hits for The Rascals from 1967 to 1969. December 1969's "Hold On" broke the run of top 40 US singles for the Rascals, stalling at #51, as well as the run of Canadian top tens, peaking at #22.

Brigati left the group in 1970, followed by Cornish in 1971. Their last Rascals album was Search and Nearness (#198 U.S.), which featured Brigati's lead vocals on the Cornish-penned "You Don't Know", a cover of The Box Tops' hit "The Letter", and drummer Danelli's composition "Fortunes". The only single release from the album to chart was the spiritually themed "Glory, Glory" (#58 U.S., #40 Canada), with backing vocals by The Sweet Inspirations. Search and Nearness would be the Rascals' last album for Atlantic Records, with Cavaliere and Danelli taking the band to Columbia Records in mid-1971.

Cavaliere shifted towards more jazz- and gospel-influenced writing for the Rascals' next two albums, the double disc Peaceful World (U.S. #122) and The Island Of Real (U.S. #180), using Robert Popwell and Buzzy Feiten on bass and guitar respectively, and new singers Annie Sutton and Molly Holt. These albums did not sell as well as their earlier work, with none of their associated singles reaching higher than #95 on the U.S. chart. Towards the end of 1970 Danny Weis joined as a replacement for Feiten on guitar. Feiten then again replaced Weis before the group disbanded.

Post break-up
Cavaliere released several solo albums during the 1970s. Brigati, with his brother David, released Lost in the Wilderness in 1976. Cornish and Danelli worked together in Bulldog, who released two albums — one for MCA Records in 1973 with the minor hit single "No", the second for Buddah in '74 — and Fotomaker, who issued three albums on Atlantic in 1978–79. In 1982, Danelli joined Steve Van Zandt in Little Steven and the Disciples of Soul for the group's first two albums.

After appearing at Atlantic Records 40th Anniversary Celebration on May 14, 1988, the Rascals reunited (with Cavaliere, Cornish, and Danelli) for a brief reunion tour in 1988. The reunion group featured an expanded lineup that included Mel Owens (in Brigati's place) on vocals and percussion, Steve Mackey on bass, Ed Mattey on guitar, Dena Iverson & Cindy McCabe on backup vocals, and a horn section from Nashville to beef up the sound. The reunion did not last beyond the end of the year.

After that, Cavaliere returned to his solo career and in the 1990s there were two factions touring: The New Rascals (featuring Cornish and Danelli) and Cavaliere, who sometimes called his grouping Felix Cavaliere's Rascals. The New Rascals lasted only a short time but toured again in 2006 with two new members, Bill Pascali (formerly of Vanilla Fudge) on vocals and keyboards and Charlie Souza on bass and vocals. The New Rascals released a concert DVD, shot at club Centro in New Jersey on Route 35.

In early 2009, Eddie Brigati put together a project of young musicians who played all the classics. Eddie performed with the group along with his brother David. Called The Boys From The Music House, the band consisted of Anthony Duke Claus, a cousin of Eddie's, on lead vocals and tambourine, Joseph Pomarico on lead guitar, harmonica and background vocals, Adam Sullivan on piano, organ, and background vocals, and Matt Gazzano on drums.

On April 24, 2010, all four members of The Rascals reunited for the Kristen Ann Carr benefit, which was held at New York's Tribeca Grill; Bruce Springsteen and Stevie Van Zandt joined the band for a closing "Good Lovin'".

 Once Upon a Dream reunion 

The group's original lineup reunited in 2012 for their first public performances in over 40 years with The Rascals: Once Upon a Dream, a combination concert/theatrical event that was produced and directed by Steven Van Zandt and Maureen Van Zandt with lighting/projection by Marc Brickman. In addition to the concert experience, the history of The Rascals, and the history of the 1960s through their music, the production features a combination of interviews with the four Rascals, filmed scenes of actors enacting key moments in the band's history, news footage, and archival footage of the band. The show originally ran for six performances in December 2012 at the Capitol Theatre in Port Chester, New York.

Fifteen performances of the show were subsequently delivered from April 15 to May 5, 2013, at the Richard Rodgers Theatre on Broadway in New York City. Near the end of the show's Broadway run, it was announced that Once Upon a Dream would be taken on the road, with performances scheduled in various cities on the East coast of North America for a six-month tour during May–November 2013.

Following its national tour, the show was expected to return to Broadway for a second three-week limited-run from December 2013 through January 2014, at the Marquis Theatre, but was canceled.

Legacy
The Rascals were inducted into the Rock and Roll Hall of Fame on May 6, 1997. Steve Van Zandt gave the induction speech and presented the award. All four original members appeared together to perform "Good Lovin'", "Groovin'", "How Can I Be Sure?", and "People Got to Be Free".

In 2005, the Rascals were inducted into the Vocal Group Hall of Fame.

In August 2007, the Rascals' catalog of Atlantic Records albums was re-released by Atlantic Records affiliate Rhino Records.

On June 18, 2009, Eddie Brigati and Felix Cavaliere were inducted into the Songwriters Hall of Fame. The ceremony was located at the Marriott Marquis Hotel in New York City, where a brief reunion took place with the founder of The Rascals, Billy (Amato) Smith.

Danelli died from coronary artery disease and congestive heart failure on December 15, 2022, at a rehabilitation facility in Manhattan, after a period of declining health. He was 78.

Members
 Original quartet 
Felix Cavaliere – lead and backing vocals, keyboards (1965–1972, 1988, 2010, 2012–2013)
 Eddie Brigati – backing and lead vocals, percussion (1965–1970, 2010, 2012–2013)
 Gene Cornish – guitar, harmonica, backing and lead vocals; occasional bass guitar (1965–1971, 1988, 2010, 2012–2013)
 Dino Danelli – drums (1965–1972, 1988, 2010, 2012–2013; died 2022)

 Unofficial members and later additions 
 David Brigati – backing and occasional lead vocals (1965–1970)
 Robert Popwell – bass guitar (1970–1972; died 2017)
Buzzy Feiten – guitar (1970,1971–1972)
 Danny Weis – guitar (1970–1971)

Discography

 The Young Rascals (1966)
 Collections (1967)
 Groovin' (1967)
 Once Upon a Dream (1968)
 Freedom Suite (1969)
 See (1969)
 Search and Nearness (1971)
 Peaceful World (1971)
 The Island of Real (1972)

References

External links

Rolling Stone: The Rascals - Rolling Stone'' articles
[ The Rascals] at Allmusic
 
 

New Rascals at newrascalsreloaded.com
"The Rascals' Struggle for Change", Pop Matters; 2007, by Tony Sclafani

Rock music groups from New Jersey
Vocal quartets
Atlantic Records artists
Musical groups established in 1965
Musical groups disestablished in 1972
1965 establishments in New Jersey
1972 disestablishments in New Jersey
American soul musical groups